Mohammadabad (also Romanized as Moḩammadābād; also known as Mohammad Abad Bampoor) is a village in Bampur-e Sharqi Rural District in the Central District of Bampur County, Sistan and Baluchestan Province, Iran. At the 2006 census, its population was 7,249, in 1,371 families.

References 

Populated places in Bampur County